Cormac Ó Gráda (born 1945) is an Irish economic historian and professor emeritus of economics at University College Dublin. His research has focused on the economic history of Ireland, Irish demographic changes, the Great Irish Famine (as well as other famines), and the history of the Jews in Ireland.

Life and career
After getting his undergraduate degree at the University College Dublin, Ó Gráda got his Ph.D. in economics from Columbia University in 1973, where he wrote his dissertation on the Irish economy before and after the Great Famine. He described his early academic career as being "a kind of jack-of-all-trades economic historian of Ireland". He credits fellow economist Joel Mokyr, whom he met in 1977 through Michael Edelstein, his graduate thesis advisor at Columbia, as the "greatest influence" his academic work. Mokyr also sharpened his interest in the Great Irish Famine, which "led eventually to the study of famines elsewhere".

He is a member of the Cliometric Society, the Economic History Society, the European Historical Economics Society, the Irish Economic and Social History Society, and the Royal Irish Academy. He has served on the editorial boards of Journal of Economic History, Explorations in Economic History, and the Agricultural History Review, and is a former coeditor for the European Review of Economic History. He is the President of the Economic History Association.

In fall 2007, he was a member at Princeton's Institute for Advanced Study as a member of the School of Historical Studies. In 2010, he won a Gold Medal from the Royal Irish Academy, of which he has been a member since 1994. He has been a visiting professor to a number of universities around the world, including the University of British Columbia, New York University, the University of Copenhagen, and Princeton University. In 2019, Trinity College Dublin awarded him with an honorary doctorate.

Publications 
Ó Gráda is a prolific writer. He has written and published seven books in addition to numerous journal articles and collaborations, with over 100 academic papers available online. He has contributed to the "Irish Economy" blog, where he commented on the Irish financial crisis. Earlier in 2008, he gave an open verdict on the future of the Celtic Tiger economy that was about to wind down.

He was also interviewed in an In Our Time (BBC) discussion programme on the Great Irish Famine in April 2019.

Books

 
 
 
 
 
 
 

The American Conference for Irish Studies awarded the James S. Donnelly, Sr. Prize to two of his books, Black '47 and Beyond (1999) and Jewish Ireland in the Age of Joyce (2006).

Journal articles 
 , with

See also
 Cliometrics
 Great Famine (Ireland)
 Joel Mokyr

Notes

Economic historians
Columbia Graduate School of Arts and Sciences alumni
Academics of University College Dublin
20th-century Irish historians
21st-century Irish historians
1945 births
Living people
Revisionist historians (Ireland)
Members of the Royal Irish Academy
Alumni of University College Dublin
Institute for Advanced Study faculty
Presidents of the Economic History Association